Richard Stone (born 5 June 1951) is a British painter, specialising in portraits.  In 1973, at the age of 22, he became the youngest commissioned royal portrait painter in almost 200 years.  Stone claims to have secured the commission by cold-calling Clarence House and saying "I could be a latter-day Rembrandt". He has completed commissioned portraits of Queen Elizabeth II, the Queen Mother, Princess Margaret, Princes Philip and Andrew, and King Charles III. He also painted the official Downing Street portrait of Margaret Thatcher, who upon inspecting his work, requested that he add her handbag to the portrait. His portraits hang at Buckingham Palace, the National Portrait Gallery (London), and the National Portrait Gallery (Australia).

Stone's 1992 portrait of Queen Elizabeth II was used by the BBC during the announcement of her death and in the subsequent obituary broadcasts.

References

External links 
 Richard Stone: Official Website

20th-century British painters
British male painters
21st-century British painters
British portrait painters
Living people
1951 births
20th-century British male artists
21st-century British male artists